Satya Pal Singh Baghel (born 21 June 1960) is an Indian politician and current Minister of State in the Ministry of Law and Justice in second run of  Narendra Modi government. A member of Bharatiya Janata Party, he got elected to 17th Lok Sabha from Agra. He previously was a member of Samajwadi Party, in which he got elected to Lok Sabha thrice and to Rajya Sabha once as a member of Bahujan Samajwadi Party.

Personal life and education
Baghel was born in Bhatpura, Umari, Etawah district, Uttar Pradesh in 1960. He was born in Gaderia family.  
Currently he is member of Lok Sabha from Agra, which is reserved for Scheduled Castes. His father was Rambhrose Singh and his mother was Ram Shree Devi. Baghel married on 30 November 1989 and has two children. Baghel has a bachelor of law degree, a master's degree in science and a doctoral degree. He attended Maharaja Jiwaji Rao University in Gwalior, Madhya Pradesh and the Meerut University in Meerut, Uttar Pradesh.

Career
In 1998, 1999 and 2004, Baghel represented the Samajwadi Party three times in the Lok Sabha from Jalesar, Uttar Pradesh. After these three terms, Baghel was suspended from his party. He then unsuccessfully contested two Lok Sabha elections as a Bahujan Samaj Party (BSP) candidate. In 2014, Baghel was elected to the Rajya Sabha (Council of States) but then in the following election, lost to the Bhartiya Janta Party candidate.

On 3 July 2015, Baghel became president of the BJP OBC Morcha (the "Other Backward Class" wing of the Bharatiya Janata Party).

In 2017, Baghel became a Member of the Legislative Assembly of Uttar Pradesh representing the Bharatiya Janata Party (BJP).
In 2019, he was elected to Lok Sabha from Agra seat on BJP ticket.

1998 - 1999 : Member of Parliament from Jalesar (First Term), Samajwadi Party 
1999 - 2004 : Member of Parliament from Jalesar (Second Term), Samajwadi Party 
2004 - 2009 : Member of Parliament from Jalesar (Third Term), Samajwadi Party 
2010 - 2014 : member of Rajya Sabha. Bahujan Samaj Party 
2017 - 2019 : M.L.A. from Tundla as BJP member 
2017 - 2019 : Cabinet Minister of Livestock, Minor Irrigation and Fisheries in Government of Uttar Pradesh. 
2019–present : Member of Parliament Lok Sabha from Agra (Fourth Term but first time as BJP member)
2021–present :Minister of state for Law and Justice  in Union Cabinet Government of India

Public office activities
In 1998 and 1999, Baghel was a member of committees on subordinate legislation, human resource development and health and family welfare. In 1999 and 2000, he was a member of committees on food, civil supplies and public distribution and an estimates committee. Between 2000 and 2004, he worked in the Ministry of Home Affairs and on committees of public undertaking, external affairs and member attendance in the House.

References

1960 births
Living people
India MPs 2004–2009
Bahujan Samaj Party politicians from Uttar Pradesh
Bharatiya Janata Party politicians from Uttar Pradesh
Chaudhary Charan Singh University alumni
Jiwaji University alumni
Lok Sabha members from Uttar Pradesh
National Democratic Alliance candidates in the 2014 Indian general election
People from Etawah
Rajya Sabha members from Uttar Pradesh
State cabinet ministers of Uttar Pradesh
Uttar Pradesh MLAs 2017–2022
Yogi ministry
India MPs 1999–2004
India MPs 1998–1999
People from Etah district
India MPs 2019–present